Lucy Mary Guerin  (born 1961) is an Australian dancer and choreographer. Her work is described as post-modern.

Life and career
Lucy Guerin was born in Adelaide, Australia, and began her dance education at local dance schools. She graduated from Adelaide's Center for Performing Arts in 1982 and found employment in Sydney with Russell Dumas' Dance Exchange in 1983. In 1988 she took a position in Melbourne with Nanette Hassall's Dance Works company.

In 1989 Guerin relocated to New York City where she danced until 1996 with companies and choreographers including Tere O'Connor, Sara Rudner and Bebe Miller, and also began working as a choreographer. She presented Solemn Pink and Incarnadine (1996) at the Rencontres choreographiques internationales de Bagnolet in France, winning the Prix d'auteur. She toured Europe from 1997–98, and received a Bessie Award in 1996 for her Two Lies. In 1996 Guerin returned to Australia, and in 2002 she established the Australian dance company Lucy Guerin Inc. In New York her work has been presented at the Baryshnikov Arts Center.

Honors and awards
Prix d'auteur, 1996
Bessie Award, 1996
Green Room Awards
Sidney Myer Performing Arts Award, 2000
Helpmann Award for Best Dance Work, 2006

Guerin was made an Officer of the Order of Australia in the 2020 Australia Day Honours for "distinguished service to contemporary dance as a choreographer, and as a mentor and advocate for emerging artists and new works."

Works
Selected works include:
Sweet Dreams (1989)
In Endless Description (1991) with Sarah Perron
Ghost in Bloom (1994)
Venus Bay (1996)
Remote (1997)
Robbery Waitress on Bail (1997)
Heavy (1998)
Zero (1999)
Soft Centre (1999)
The Ends of Things (2000)
Living with Surfaces (2001)
Melt (2002)
Tell Me (2003) with Michael Lenz
Tense Dave (2003) with Gideon Obarzanek and Michael Kantor
Plasticine Park (2003) with Patricia Piccinini
The Firebird 2003
Baroque Masterworks for the Australian Opera (2004)
 Structure and Sadness (2006)
Corridor (2008)
Untrained (2009)
Human Interest Story (2010)
Conversation Piece (2012)
Weather (2012)
Microclimate (2015)
Motion Picture (2015)
The Dark Chorus (2016)
Attractor (2017
Split (2017)
Make Your Own World (2019)
Metal (2020)

References

External links
 Official site
 Archival footage of Lucy Guerin Inc. performing Structure and Sadness in 2010 at Jacob's Pillow Dance Festival.
 Lucy Guerin Inc performs Aether #2
 

1961 births
Living people
Australian female dancers
Bessie Award winners
Contemporary dance choreographers
Dance in New York City
Helpmann Award winners
Modern dancers
Officers of the Order of Australia